Erigeron tianschanicus is an Asian species of flowering plant in the family Asteraceae. It grows on open slopes in Xinjiang and Kazakhstan.

Erigeron tianschanicus is a perennial, clumping-forming herb up to 60 cm (2 feet) tall, producing woody rhizomes and a branching caudex. Its flower heads have blue ray florets surrounding yellow disc florets.

References

tianschanicus
Flora of Xinjiang
Flora of Kazakhstan
Tian Shan
Plants described in 1948
Taxa named by Victor Botchantsev